The  was the 57th edition of the Japanese Regional Leagues, the fifth tier of the Japanese football league system. As usual, this edition of the Regional Leagues was divided with 84 teams distributed in nine regional leagues. The winners of the first division of each Regional League along with other three between the nine Regional Leagues runners-up (determined by criteria set by the JFA), qualified for the 2022 Japanese Regional Football Champions League. It served as a single-elimination tournament, in which the winner and the runner-up of the competition can also qualify either directly for the Japan Football League (JFL), or by a play-off match with one of the last-placed teams at the JFL table, with the confirmation of how must the winner (and/or runner-up) get promoted to the JFL being made by the league board.

Champions list

Regional League Standings

Hokkaido

Tohoku
For the 2022 season, league matches will be held according to the following guidelines:

The season is divided in two phases, each club plays 1 game against every other team.
After the first phase of matches, by which all clubs will have played eleven games, the league splits into two halves - a 'top six section' and a 'bottom six section'. Each club plays a further five matches, one against each of the other five teams in their own section. Points achieved during the first phase of 11 matches are carried forward to the second phase, but the teams compete only within their own sections during the second phase. After the first phase is completed, clubs cannot move out of their own half in the league, even if they achieve more or fewer points than a higher or lower ranked team, respectively.
The second division will determine the final standings in both the North-South Leagues with a round-robin league campaign.
 Dogizaka FC changed its name to Bogolle.D.Tsugaru FC prior to the start of the season.

Kantō

Hokushinetsu

Tōkai

Kansai

Chūgoku

Shikoku

Kyushu

References

External links
rsssf.com

2022
2022 in Japanese football leagues